Isaac Phillipjunio Silafau (born October 5, 1990) is an American Samoan sprinter. He competed at the 2016 Summer Olympics in the men's 100 metres race; his time of 11.51 seconds in the preliminary round did not qualify him for the first round.

References

External links
 

1990 births
Living people
American people of Samoan descent
American Samoan male sprinters
Olympic track and field athletes of American Samoa
Athletes (track and field) at the 2016 Summer Olympics